
Gmina Andrespol is a rural gmina (administrative district) in Łódź East County, Łódź Voivodeship, in central Poland.

Villages
Gmina Andrespol contains the villages and settlements of Andrespol, Bedoń Przykościelny, Bedoń-Wieś, Janówka, Justynów, Kraszew, Nowy Bedoń, Stróża, Wiśniowa Góra and Zielona Góra.

Neighbouring gminas
Gmina Andrespol is bordered by the city of Łódź and by the gminas of Brójce, Brzeziny, Koluszki and Nowosolna.

References

Polish official population figures 2006

Andrespol
Łódź East County